The Gorilla Mystery is a 1930 Mickey Mouse animated film produced by Walt Disney for Columbia Pictures, as part of the Mickey Mouse film series. It was the twenty-second Mickey Mouse short to be produced, the seventh of that year.

The short is a spoof of the 1925 play The Gorilla by Ralph Spence, which had been made into a 1927 silent film and a sound remake.

Plot
Mickey Mouse reads in the newspaper that a gorilla has escaped from the zoo, and he calls Minnie to warn her. She is not afraid, and sings a song to Mickey over the phone. Then the gorilla breaks into her house and kidnaps her, and Mickey—hearing her screams over the telephone—rushes to save the damsel in distress. The gorilla takes Minnie upstairs to the attic and ties her up, then plays cat and mouse with Mickey. At the end, the gorilla trips over the rope, knocking him senseless. Mickey and Minnie dance to celebrate their narrow escape.

Production
While the gorilla in the short isn't named, it was retroactively identified as the same gorilla seen in the 1933 shorts Mickey's Mechanical Man and The Pet Store, named Beppo.

The 1944 short Donald Duck and the Gorilla has a similar plot to this film, with a killer gorilla named Ajax escaping from the local zoo.

Reception
In Mickey's Movies: The Theatrical Films of Mickey Mouse, Gijs Grob observes, "The Gorilla Mystery is noteworthy for the extensive dialogue in the beginning. By now the Disney animators had mastered lip-sync, and neither Mickey nor Minnie show any awkward faces while talking. Even more interesting is the cartoon's elaborately drawn gorilla, which in several scenes is staged to show its huge size. The gorilla and the clever use of light and shadow make The Gorilla Mystery look more sophisticated than earlier Mickey Mouse cartoons. Even The Fire Fighters of only three months earlier starts to look primitive."

Motion Picture News (December 6, 1930): "This is not up to the standard of other Mickey Mouse cartoons, but it is a good comedy, nevertheless. The telephone sequence is especially good."

Voice cast
 Mickey Mouse: Walt Disney
 Minnie Mouse: Marcellite Garner
 Beppo the Gorilla: Purv Pullen
Duck/Hens/Rooster: Larry Steers
Parrot/Cucko: George Magrill

Home media
The short was released on December 2, 2002, on Walt Disney Treasures: Mickey Mouse in Black and White.

See also
Mickey Mouse (film series)

References

External links 
 The Gorilla Mystery at Internet Movie Database
 The Gorilla Mystery at the Big Cartoon DataBase

1930s Disney animated short films
Mickey Mouse short films
1930 short films
1930 animated films
1930 films
Films directed by Burt Gillett
Films produced by Walt Disney
American black-and-white films
Animated films about gorillas
Columbia Pictures short films
Columbia Pictures animated short films
1930 comedy films
1930s English-language films
1930s American films